Robert Shimer (born August 21, 1968) is an American macroeconomist and labor economist who currently holds the Alvin H. Baum Chair in the Economics Department of the University of Chicago. He was an editor of the Journal of Political Economy from 2004 to 2012. His research focuses on the search and matching approach to labor economics. He is especially known for arguing that the standard labor market matching model predicts fluctuations in the unemployment rate much smaller than those actually observed over the business cycle, an observation which has sometimes been called the Shimer puzzle. His book Labor Markets and Business Cycles was published in 2010 by Princeton University Press, and was recommended by Robert Hall:
Shimer's definitive account of the modern theory of labor market volatility presents many new results and deserves a prominent place on the bookshelf of every macroeconomist and labor economist.

Publication

Research

Labor Choice
In 2017, Shimer coauthored a paper entitled, "High Wage Workers Work for High Wage Firms." The working paper sought to measure the correlation between worker quality and firm wage rates.  Using Austrian administrative data, he found a correlation between worker and firm types of 0.4 to 0.6.  This implies a contradiction to previous work which found no correlation between types.

External links
 Robert Shimer's homepage
 NBER Research Summary

1968 births
Living people
Labor economists
Macroeconomists
20th-century American economists
21st-century American economists
Fellows of the Econometric Society
Fellows of the American Academy of Arts and Sciences
Yale University alumni
Alumni of the University of Oxford
Massachusetts Institute of Technology alumni
Princeton University faculty
University of Chicago faculty
Journal of Political Economy editors